Petropavlovka is a rural locality (a selo) in Petropavlovsky Selsoviet of Svobodnensky District, Amur Oblast, Russia. The population is 69 as of 2018.

Geography 
The village is located on the left bank of the Amur River, 113 km west from Svobodny.

References 

Rural localities in Svobodnensky District